The Sirte Declaration was the resolution adopted by the Organisation of African Unity on 9 September 1999, at the fourth Extraordinary Session of the OAU Assembly of African Heads of State and Government held at Sirte, Libya.  The Declaration announces decisions to:
establish the African Union
speed up the implementation of the provisions of the Abuja Treaty, to create an African Economic Community, African Central Bank, African Monetary Union, African Court of Justice and Pan-African Parliament, with the Parliament to be established by 2000
prepare a Constitutive Act of the African Union that can be ratified by 31 December 2000 and become effective the following year
give President Abdelaziz Bouteflika of Algeria and President Thabo Mbeki of South Africa a mandate to negotiate for the cancellation of the African indebtedness
convene an African Ministerial Conference on security, stability, development and co-operation

The Declaration was followed by summits at Lomé in 2000, when the Constitutive Act of the African Union was adopted, and at Lusaka in 2001, when the plan for the implementation of the African Union was adopted.  The first session of the Assembly of the African Union was held in Durban on 9 July 2002.

The inaugural session of the Pan-African Parliament was held in March 2004.

See also

African Union
Organisation of African Unity
Great Socialist People's Libyan Arab Jamahiriya

External links
Text of the Sirte Declaration
History behind the Sirte Declaration

African Union treaties
Treaties concluded in 1999
Sirte
1999 in Libya